Elim may refer to:

Places
 Elim Aboriginal Mission, Queensland, Australia

Africa
 Elim, Western Cape, a village on the Agulhas Plain in the Western Cape of South Africa
 Elim (Bible), one of the places where the Israelites camped following their Exodus from Egypt

Namibia
 Elim Constituency, an electoral constituency in the Omusati Region of Namibia
 Elim Dune, a dune in the Sossusvlei salt and clay pan of the Namib desert
 Elim, Namibia, a village in the north-east of the Republic of Namibia

Europe
 Elim, Anglesey, a village in Wales
 Elim, Drenthe, a village in the Netherlands
 Elim Chapel, Cwmdare, Rhondda Cynon Taf, Wales

United States
 Elim Township, Custer County, Nebraska
 Elim, Alaska, a city in Nome Census Area
 Elim, Pennsylvania, an unincorporated community and census-designated place in Upper Yoder Township, Cambria County

People and characters
 Fínnachta (given name Elim), a High King of Ireland in succession to his father
A rank of angel mentioned in The Zohar in Exodus 43a
 Elim Garak, a fictional character from the television series Star Trek: Deep Space Nine
 Elim Meshchersky (1808–1844), Russian diplomat and poet

Churches and religious organizations
 Elim Bible Institute and College, a Bible college in Lima, New York, USA
 Elim Church Singapore, one of the first Pentecostal churches to be established in Singapore
 Mision Cristiana Elim Internacional (also Elim Central), a pentecostal megachurch in San Salvador, El Salvador
 Elim Pentecostal Church, a UK-based Pentecostal Christian denomination
 Elim Fellowship, a North American–based Pentecostal/charismatic Christian denomination

Other
 Elim (Bethel, Missouri), USA; a historic house
 Elim Mission massacre

See also

LIM (disambiguation)
Elimination (disambiguation)